Adejoke Aderonke Tugbiyele (born 1977) is a Nigerian-American multidisciplinary visual artist and activist. She is known primarily as a sculptor, performer, and filmmaker, but has also worked in painting, drawing, and textiles. Her work deals with issues of human rights, queer rights and women's rights. She lives in Ouagadougou, Burkina Faso.

Biography  
Adejoke Aderonke Tugbiyele was born December 4, 1977 in Brooklyn, New York City, New York. In early childhood she moved with her family to Lagos, Nigeria. In high school she returned to New York City to attend the High School of Art and Design. She identifies as queer.

Tugbiyele has a B.S. degree (2002) in architecture from New Jersey Institute of Technology; and a M.F.A. degree (2013) from the Rinehart School of Sculpture at Maryland Institute College of Art (MICA).

Tugbiyele's work has been influenced by artists including El Anatsui, Fela Kuti, Ai Weiwei, Kara Walker, Zanele Muholi, and Rotimi Fani-Kayode.

Tugbiyele has been affiliated with the Nigerian NGO, Initiative for Equal Rights which provides emergency assistance to LGBT Nigerians. She has served as a United States-based representative for Solidarity Alliance for Human Rights, a coalition of Nigerian organizations working for human rights, queer rights and activism, and to fight against HIV/AIDS.

Her work is in various public museum collections, including the Brooklyn Museum, and Museum of Modern Art, Warsaw.

References

Further reading 
 

1977 births
Living people
American people of Nigerian descent
Artists from Lagos
Artists from Brooklyn
Maryland Institute College of Art alumni
New Jersey Institute of Technology alumni
High School of Art and Design alumni
Nigerian LGBT artists
American LGBT artists
Nigerian LGBT rights activists
People from Ouagadougou
American LGBT rights activists